Angela Denoke (born 27 November 1961) is a German opera singer (soprano).

Born in Stade, she studied at the University of Music and Drama of Hamburg. Her first contract was at the Theater Ulm (1992–1996), where she sang Fiordiligi (Così fan tutte), Donna Anna (Don Giovanni) and Agathe (Der Freischütz), among other roles. Angela Denoke sang also the title role in Der Rosenkavalier at the Theater Ulm, in a production directed by Peter Pikl and conducted by James Allen Gähres, in September 1994. This was concurrent with her debut as 'The Marschallin'. She then worked at the Stuttgart Opera and performed at the Vienna State Opera, the Salzburg Festival, and the Metropolitan Opera in New York City.

She regularly sings at all the major opera companies in the world; in Berlin, Hamburg, Dresden, London, Paris, San Francisco, and Chicago. In April 1997, Denoke debuted at the Vienna State Opera as the Marschallin in Der Rosenkavalier, the same role she sang when debuting at the Metropolitan Opera in 2005. July 1997 saw Denoke's debut at the Salzburg Festival, as Marie in Peter Stein's production of Wozzeck, conducted by Claudio Abbado. In 2006, she sang the title role in Richard Strauss' Salome at the Bayerische Staatsoper, directed by William Friedkin and conducted by  Kent Nagano.

In opera and in concerts, Denoke worked with conductors such as Claudio Abbado, Daniel Barenboim, Sylvain Cambreling, Christoph Eschenbach, James Allen Gähres, Hartmut Haenchen, Zubin Mehta, Ingo Metzmacher, Kent Nagano, Seiji Ozawa, Mikhail Pletnev, Sir Simon Rattle, Donald Runnicles, Esa-Pekka Salonen, Giuseppe Sinopoli, Stefan Soltesz and Christian Thielemann.

In 1999, she was named Singer of the Year by the magazine Opernwelt.

References

Much of the information in this article comes from the German-language Wikipedia article.

Further Sources
Biography and discography on Naxos Records
Biography on the Edinburgh International Festival web site
Metropolitan Opera Data Base
Andrew Clements, 'Duke Bluebeard's Castle/Erwartung', The Guardian, May 29, 2006 (Review of Denoke's Royal Opera House debut in Erwartung)
Jeremy Eichler, 'Lushly Lamenting the Wages of Time and a Lost Golden Age', The New York Times, March 15, 2005. (Review of Denoke's Metropolitan Opera debut in Der Rosenkavalier)
Joshua Kosman, 'Faust triumphs with or without orgy', San Francisco Chronicle, June 12, 2003 (Review of Denoke's San Francisco Opera debut (and US debut) in La Damnation de Faust)

1961 births
Living people
People from Stade
German operatic sopranos
Hochschule für Musik und Theater Hamburg alumni
Österreichischer Kammersänger
20th-century German women  opera singers
21st-century German  women opera singers